Club Atlético de San Luis, commonly known as Atlético San Luis, is a Mexican professional football club based in San Luis Potosí, replacing San Luis Potosí's Liga MX team San Luis FC after its relocation. San Luis was promoted to Liga MX in 2019.

History 
After the Clausura 2013 season, San Luis F.C., San Luis Potosí's first division franchise, relocated to Tuxtla Gutiérrez and became Chiapas F.C., leaving the city without a first division team. Jacobo Payán, owner of Estadio Alfonso Lastras and one of the largest employers of this state, acquired Tiburones Rojos de Veracruz from Ascenso MX and relocated it to the city. This sale happened after La Piedad, who recently won promotion, relocated to Veracruz.

Albeit the identity confusion, Atlético is essentially a resurrection of San Luis Fútbol Club geographically and aesthetically speaking. This is clearly reflected in the new shield that keeps the traditional blue and gold colors of the State of San Luis Potosí, although in darker hues.

The Apertura 2013 was their first tournament in the Ascenso MX, in which they gained access to their first league play, finishing seventh place in the overall standings, later to be eliminated by Club Necaxa in the quarterfinals. The first leg was held at the Estadio Alfonso Lastras Ramírez with a score of 2–0 in favor of Necaxa set, and back at the Victoria Stadium (Aguascalientes) with a score of 2–0 in favor of Necaxa, and so Atletico San Luis was eliminated 4–0 on aggregate.

Dissolution 
The Jaguares de Chiapas franchise nearly moved back to San Luis Potosí in time for the 2016–17 Liga MX season however the deal fell through causing San Luis to be unable to register for the Ascenso nor the top-tier league. The 2016–17 season ended up being a season without football for the city of San Luis Potosí.

Atlético Madrid alliance 
On 16 March 2017 Atlético Madrid announced a 50% ownership of the club along with the state of San Luis and other minority owners. The goal was for Atlético Madrid to carry their club talents to San Luis. The club was expected to compete in the Ascenso MX for the 2017–18 season. Manager Salvador Reyes Jr. intends on relying on prospects from Atletico Madrid's academy to supplement his roster for the 2017–2018 campaign.

Promotion to Liga MX 
On 5 May 2019 Atlético San Luis beat rivals Dorados de Sinaloa for the second consecutive time in a tournament final, thus promoting them to the first division of Mexican football.

Stadium

Atlético San Luis play their home matches at the Estadio Alfonso Lastras in San Luis Potosí City, San Luis Potosí. The stadium capacity is 25,709 people. It is owned by Jacobo Payán Latuff, and its surface is covered by natural grass. The stadium was opened in May 1999.

Honours
Ascenso MX (2): Apertura 2018, Clausura 2019

Personnel

Management

Coaching staff

Players

First-team squad

Out on loan

Reserve teams

Managers

 Miguel Fuentes (2013–14)
 Flavio Davino (2014)
 Raúl Arias (2015)
 Carlos Bustos (2016)
 Salvador Luis Reyes (2017)
 José Francisco Molina (2017–2018)
 Alfonso Sosa (2018–2019)
 Gustavo Matosas (2019)
 Guillermo Vázquez (2020)
 Leonel Rocco (2021)
 Marcelo Méndez (2021–2022)
 André Jardine (2022-Current)

References

External links
 

 
Football clubs in San Luis Potosí
Association football clubs established in 2013
Ascenso MX teams
2013 establishments in Mexico